Colubrina nicholsonii (Pondo weeping thorn) is a species of tree in the family Rhamnaceae. It is a protected species endemic to South Africa. The plant grows in subpopulations in isolated gorges, usually of 10-20 and less than 50 individuals overhanging water. It is estimated that there are no more than 1,000 individuals in the wild.

References

nicholsonii
Endemic flora of South Africa
Endangered flora of Africa
Protected trees of South Africa